Ataköy is a quarter of Bakırköy district in Istanbul Province, Turkey. It was developed as one of the first examples of satellite-city projects in Turkey.

Ataköy is located in Bakırköy district on the European side of Istanbul. It is adjacent to Bahçelievler district and Şirinevler neighborhood. The area in the then outskirt of Istanbul City, which Ataköy today covers, belonged to the Turkish military, and was called Baruthane (literally: gunpowder magazine). In the 1950s, the government of Prime Minister Adnan Menderes (in office (1950–1960) transferred the property to the state-owned realty business bank Emlak Bank for envelopment as a satellite city of affordable housing for middle income households. In 1956, the project started with the construction of a beach site. The residence area was named "Ataköy" (literally "Atatürkville"). The project included 12,000 apartments, three hotels, beach, clubs, shopping malls, cultural center and sports facilities. 

Ataköy quarter consists of four neighborhoods with eleven sections of apartment blocks. The quarter is a peaceful residential area with wide green zones. The neighborhoods in the quarter are the Ataköy 1st Section, the 2nd-5th-6th Section, the 3rd-4th-11th Section and the 7th-8th-9th-10th Section. The 9th and 10th Sections were developed in 1986, and the 7th and 8th Sections were completed in 1990. In the recent years, some construction companies built residence blocks around the existing apartment blocks. 

Following facilities are situated in Ataköy: Yunus Emre Cultural Center, Conservatoty of Bakırköy Municipality, Ataköy Marina, Atrium Shopping Mall, Galleria Ataköy and Ataköy A Plus Shopping Mall, Sinan Erdem Dome, Ataköy Athletics Arena.

Population
As of 2017, the total population of the four neighborhoods in the quarter was 47,932 with the number of women exceeding that of men.

Environment 
Ataköy is one of the most green areas in İstanbul because it was constructed in 1950's as one of the first planned collective housings. Recently the large part of coast of Ataköy has been undergone a dense housing that consists of many residences and hotels, so green areas of Ataköy was decreased. The dense housing was stopped by opinion of court due to infringement of coastal law. The government (justice and development party, AKP) ignored the opinion of court and committed ecocide.  

However, after 2019 Turkish local elections new mayor Ekrem İmamoğlu began to create major green areas (life valleys), one of which is Hagia Mama (Ayamama) life valley. It has long cycle route, walking route and many sports arenas. In addition to existent trees, many new trees are going to be planted in the life valley.

Transportation
Ataköy is served by the metro line M1 at Ataköy—Şirinevler station and by Marmaray at the Ataköy station. The city bus lines 71T-72T and 71AT connect the location with Taksim Square.

References

Quarters in Istanbul
Bakırköy